Tisias is a genus of skippers in the family Hesperiidae.

Species
Tisias caesena (Hewitson, 1867)
Tisias carystoides Nicolay, 1980
Tisias lesueur (Latreille, [1824])
Tisias myna (Mabille, 1889)

References

External links
Natural History Museum Lepidoptera genus database

Hesperiinae
Hesperiidae genera
Taxa named by Frederick DuCane Godman